The Delahaye 135 is a luxury car manufactured by French automaker Delahaye. Designed by engineer Jean François, it was produced from 1935 until 1954 in many different body styles. A sporting tourer, it was also popular for racing.

History
The Delahaye 135, also known as "Coupe des Alpes" after its success in the Alpine Rally, was first presented in 1935 and signified Delahaye's decision to build sportier cars than before. The 3.2-litre overhead valve straight-six with four-bearing crankshaft was derived from one of Delahaye's truck engines and was also used in the more sedate, longer wheelbase Delahaye 138.

The 135 featured independent, leaf-sprung front suspension, a live rear axle, and cable operated Bendix brakes. 17-inch spoked wheels were also standard. Transmission was either a partially synchronized four-speed manual or four-speed Cotal pre-selector transmission.

Competition 135s set the all-time record at the Ulster Tourist Trophy and placed second and third in the Mille Miglia in 1936, and the 1938 24 Hours of Le Mans.

The list of independent body suppliers offering to clothe the 135 chassis is the list of France's top coachbuilders of the time, including Figoni & Falaschi, Letourneur et Marchand, Alphonse Guilloré, Marcel Pourtout, Frères Dubois, Jacques Saoutchik, Marius Franay, Henri Chapron, Faget-Varnay, Antem, and others.

Production of the 3.2-litre version ended with the German occupation in 1940 and was not taken up again after the end of hostilities.

135M

A larger-displacement (3,557 cc) 135M was introduced in 1936. Largely the same as the regular 135, the new engine offered 90, 105, or 115 hp, with either one, two, or three carburetors. As with the 135/138, a less sporty, longer wheelbase version was also built, called the "148". The 148 had a 3,150 mm wheelbase, or 3,350 mm in a seven-seater version. On the two shorter wheelbases, a 134N was also available, with a 2,150 cc four-cylinder version of the 3.2-litre six from the 135. Along with a brief return of the 134, production of 148, 135M, and 135MS models was resumed after the end of the war. The 135 and 148 were then joined by the one litre larger engined Delahaye 175 / 175S; 178; and 180, being an entirely new series that was under development before the war. When the large displacement chassis-series was discontinued in 1951, the 135M was updated to be introduced as the Type 235, as a last ditch effort to save Delahaye. It was a fine product, and was offered until the demise of Delahaye in 1954. Only 84 examples were built.

168
Presented in December 1938 and built until the outbreak of war in 1940, the Type 168 used the 148L's chassis and engine (engine code 148N) in Renault Viva Grand Sport bodywork. Wheelbase remained 315 cm while the use of artillery wheels rather than spoked items meant minor differences in track. This curious hybrid was the result of an effort by Renault to steal in on Delahaye's lucrative near monopoly on fire vehicles: after a complaint by Delahaye, Renault relinquished contracts it had gained, but in return Delahaye had to agree to purchase a number of Viva Grand Sport bodyshells. In an effort to limit the market of this cuckoo's egg, thus limiting the number of bodyshells it had to purchase from Renault, Delahaye chose to equip it with the unpopular Wilson preselector (even though the marketing material referred to the Cotal version). This succeeded very well, and with the war putting a stop to car production, no more than thirty were supposedly built. Strong, wide, and fast, like their Viva Grand Sport half sisters, the 168s proved popular with the army. Many were equipped to run on gazogène during the war and very few (if any) remain.

135MS

An even sportier version, the 135MS, soon followed; 120–145 hp were available, with competition versions offering over 160 hp. The 135MS was the version most commonly seen in competition, and continued to be available until 1954, when new owners Hotchkiss finally called a halt. The MS had the 2.95 m wheelbase, but competition models sat on a shortened 2.70 m chassis.

The Type 235, a rebodied 135MS with ponton-style design by Philippe Charbonneaux, appeared in 1951.

Competition

The 135 was successful as a racing car during the late 1930s, winning the Monte Carlo Rally in 1937 and 24 Hours of Le Mans in 1938. The Le Mans victory, with Chaboud and Trémoulet at the wheel, was decisive, with two more Delahayes coming in second and fourth. A regular 135 came seventh at the 1935 Le Mans, and in 1937 135MS came in second and third. Appearing again in 1939, two 135MS made it to sixth and eighth place, and again after the war the now venerable 135MS finished in 5th, 9th, and 10th. 135s finished 2nd, 3rd, 4th, 5th, 7th, 11th and 12th in the 1936 French Sports Car Grand Prix at Montlhéry.

John Crouch won the 1949 Australian Grand Prix driving a 135MS.

References

Notes

Bibliography

External links 
 

1940s cars
1950s cars
Delahaye vehicles
Le Mans winning cars
Rally cars
Rear-wheel-drive vehicles
Cars introduced in 1935